is a Japanese actress. Prior to marrying director Banmei Takahashi in 1982, she went by her maiden name . She debuted in the 1970 film High School Student Blues. Her second film, おさな妻, earned her the Golden Arrow Award for Newcomer of the Year.

In 1981 she appeared in the Nikkatsu Roman Porno film Love Letter, a fictionalized account of the life of poet Mitsuharu Kaneko, which Nikkatsu hoped would appeal to both male and female audiences. In 1982 she was the female lead in her husband Banmei Takahashi's launch into mainstream film, Tattoo Ari. In 2008, she won the Mainichi Film Award for Best Supporting Actress for her work in Fumiko no Umi. She was given Mainichi's Tanaka Kinuyo Award in 2010.

Filmography

Film
High School Student Blues (1970)
Osanazuma (1970)
Just for You (1970)
The Forbidden Fruit (1970)
Games(1971)
Rise, Fair Sun (1973) as Haruko
Mainline to Terror (1975) as Tomoko Kimihara
The Gate of Youth (1975) as Hate Hiiragi
Gambare Wakadaishō
Love Letter (1981)
Tattoo Ari (1982) as Michiyo
Dai Nippon Teikoku (1982) as Miyo Arai
Lake of Illusions (1982)
Wolf (1982)
Love Letter (1985)
Jiro's Story (1987)
Door (1988)
Otokotachi no kaita e) (1996)
Gendai ninkyoden (1997)
Magnitude (1997)
Uzumaki (2000)
Drug (2001)
Legendary Crocodile Jake and His Fellows (2004)
Fumiko no Umi (2007)
Be Sure to Share (2009)
Akai Tama (2015)
Summer Blooms (2018)

Television
 Taiyō ni Hoero! (1972–74) as Nobuko Uchida (Shinko)
 Tokugawa Ieyasu (1983)
 Nobunaga: King of Zipangu  (1992), Rui
 Aoi (2001), Orin
 Seibu Keisatsu Special (2004)

References

External links
Official site 

Keiko Takahashi  at Japanese Movie Database

1955 births
Living people
Japanese actresses
Pink film actors
People from Hokkaido